Kilidougou is a commune in the Cercle of Dioïla in the Koulikoro Region of south-western Mali. The principal town lies at N'Tobougou. In 1998 the commune had a population of 10,856.

The commune of Kilidougou was created by Act No. 96 on October 16, 1996. It is located east of the central district.

References

Communes of Koulikoro Region